Stanhope Bayne-Jones (November 6, 1888 – February 20, 1970)  was an American physician, bacteriologist, medical historian and a United States Army medical officer with the rank of brigadier general.

Early years

Bayne-Jones was born on November 6, 1888, in New Orleans, Louisiana as the son of physician. His grandfather Joseph Jones was also a physician and served in the medical department of the Confederate States Army during the American Civil War. In this way, Bayne-Jones was influenced in his future career choice. Bayne-Jones attended the Dixon Academy in Covington, Louisiana and then enrolled the Yale University. He graduated in 1910 with A.B. degree. Subsequently, Bayne-Jones matriculated at the Johns Hopkins School of Medicine in Baltimore, Maryland, receiving his Doctor of Medicine degree in 1914.

He became a teacher and also a researcher in the fields of bacteriology and immunology. Bayne-Jones received a commission of First Lieutenant in the Medical Reserve Corps, U.S. Army on August 7, 1915.

Notes

As a member of the United States Surgeon General's Advisory Committee on Smoking and Health, he had a significant role in the 1964 report linking smoking to cancer.

Bayne-Jones was the subject of a biography in 1992.

Bayne-Jones Community Hospital at the US Army's Fort Polk is named in his honor, as is a professorship at Johns Hopkins University School of Medicine.

His papers were donated to the United States National Library of Medicine in the late 1960s.

Bayne-Jones was the first master of Yale University's Trumbull College from 1932 to 1938.

Decorations

Shown below is the ribbon bar of Bayne-Jones as a Brigadier general:

References

External links
Generals of World War II
Stanhope Bayne-Jones Papers (1852-1969) - National Library of Medicine finding aid

1888 births
1970 deaths
Scientists from New Orleans
20th-century American physicians
Yale University alumni
Johns Hopkins School of Medicine alumni
Johns Hopkins University faculty
American bacteriologists
American medical historians
United States Army personnel of World War I
United States Army Medical Corps officers
United States Army generals
Recipients of the Distinguished Service Medal (US Army)
Recipients of the Silver Star
Honorary Commanders of the Order of the British Empire
Recipients of the Military Cross
Recipients of the Croix de Guerre 1914–1918 (France)
Burials at Arlington National Cemetery
Military personnel from Louisiana
Historians from Louisiana
United States Army generals of World War II